Two of the four Democratic-Republicans were replaced by Federalists, bringing the Federalists from a 4–4 split to a 6-2 majority.

See also 
 United States House of Representatives elections, 1796 and 1797
 List of United States representatives from Maryland

1796
Maryland
United States House of Representatives